The 1978–79 season was the sixth and last season of the Takht Jamshid Cup of Iranian football. The competition was not completed due to the Iranian Revolution.

Results

References

Takht Jamshid Cup
Iran
1978–79 in Iranian football